Pål Mikael Lundin (born 21 November 1964) is a former professional footballer who played in The Football League for Oxford United.

References

External links 
 

Swedish footballers
Oxford United F.C. players
English Football League players
Living people
1964 births
Association football goalkeepers